Çukurçayır can refer to:

 Çukurçayır
 Çukurçayır, Çat
 Çukurçayır, Savaştepe